Honorata Skarbek, also known as Honey, (born 23 December 1992) is a Polish professional singer, songwriter and fashion blogger.

Award winner at the festival TOPtrendy 2011 in Sopot and VIVA Comet Awards 2012 in the category debut of the year. Her debut album, "Honey", released on 28 March 2011 was promoted by such hits as "No One", "Runaway", and "Sabotage". In 2013 the singer was nominated for Kids' Choice Award 2013. She was a support act during the first Justin Bieber concert in Poland, which took place on 25 March 2013 at the Atlas Arena in Łódź.

Her second album, "Million", was released on 16 April 2013. First promo single was "Lalalove" (English version is called "Don't Love Me"). The second single from this album is called "Nie powiem jak" (Aeroplane) and is taking premiere on 25 March 2013.

Discography

Studio albums

Singles

Tours

Headlining 

 The Sabotage Tour (2011–2013)
 My Name Is Million Tour (2013–2014)
 Puzzle Tour (2015–2016)

Supporting 

 Justin Bieber – Believe Tour (2013; Poland)

References

1992 births
Living people
People from Zgorzelec
Polish bloggers
Polish fashion
Fashion journalists
Polish women journalists
Polish pop singers
English-language singers from Poland
Polish women bloggers
21st-century Polish singers
21st-century Polish women singers